For the Summer Olympics there are 25 venues that have been or will be used for volleyball.

See also
List of Olympic venues in beach volleyball

References

 
Vol
Venues
Volleyball-related lists